Maine is a surname. Notable people with the surname include:

Charles Eric Maine (1921–1981), pen name of David McIlwain, English writer
Henry James Sumner Maine (1822–1888), British legal historian
John Maine (born 1981), American baseball player
Mack Maine (born 1985), American rapper and singer
Scott Maine (born 1985), American baseball player

Fictional characters:
Jackson Maine, a fictional character in the 2018 film A Star Is Born (2018 film)
Norman Maine, a fictional character in the 1937 film A Star Is Born and the 1954 remake
Olivia Maine, a fictional character in the American television series This Is Us

See also
Maines (surname)